Mister Denmark (Danish: Mister Danmark) is the oldest, largest and most prestigious national male beauty pageant in Denmark that selects the representative to the Mister World pageant.

Organization
Mister Denmark was founded in 1994 by Miss Denmark Organization. The Miss Danmark pageant was established in 1926 when the country hosted its first national beauty contest whose winner was Edith Jørgensen. Since 1994 Denmark competes in many male International pageants.

From 1996 until 2013, Memborg models operated the contest. In 2015, the rights to hold the Mister and Miss Denmark national beauty pageant have been awarded to Lisa Lents of Miss & Mister Denmark Org. The titleholders of Mister Denmark from now on will compete at Mister World, Mister International, Men Universe Model and Manhunt International.

Titleholders
Color key

Mister Denmark Organization by Lisa Lents does responsible selecting the official Danish Mister to most prestigious male pageant in the world. The Mister Denmark together with Miss Denmark Team organizes Mister Denmark casting and appoints the male model contestants every year to be role model of Denmark. The titleholders may represent Denmark to the main pageants, namely Mister World, Mister International, Men Universe Model and Manhunt International pageants.

Mister World Denmark

Mister International Denmark

Men Universe Model Denmark

Manhunt International Denmark

Notes
The very first Mister Denmark who crowned International title was Nicklas Pedersen. He was crowned as Mister World 2014 represented Denmark at the Riviera International Conference Centre, Torbay, on 15 June 2014. He beat the 45 contestants to win Mister World. Additionally, he was awarded as The Sport Challenge Winner. He was nominated into the Top 10 of Extreme Sport Challenge and Top 3 Multi-Media Challenge at the pageant.

See also
Miss Denmark

References

External links
 Official site

Denmark
Denmark
World
Recurring events established in 1994
Danish awards